The Big Operator (a.k.a. Anatomy of the Syndicate) is a black and white 1959 American crime/drama film starring Mickey Rooney as a corrupt union boss, with Steve Cochran, Mel Torme and Mamie Van Doren as co-stars. The film is a remake of Joe Smith, American (1942) with labor union thugs replacing Axis spies.

Plot
Ruthless union leader "Little Joe" Braun (Rooney) is due to face questioning from a Senate committee. On the night preceding the inquiry, he sends a hit man, Oscar "The Executioner" Wetzel, to kill a witness named Tragg and steal incriminating documents in Tragg's possession at a factory.

The union has two very different factions, and one group are surprised to find the other on strike when they arrive at work. Demanding a meeting with Braun it is clear that unless they toe the line they are out. McAfee is thrown out of the union allegedly because his dues are not up to date.

Factory workers and friends Bill Gibson and Fred McAfee are accidental eyewitnesses to Wetzel meeting with Braun shortly after the crime. Braun pleads the Fifth Amendment during his Senate testimony and vehemently denies knowing the mob enforcer Wetzel. But with a perjury charge facing him, Braun realizes that Gibson and McAfee could potentially put him behind bars.

A campaign of intimidation against the two men begins. They are harassed at work and then fired on false grounds. McAfee is set afire and nearly dies from the burns. Gibson and wife Mary panic after their son Timmy is taken captive.

Gibson, who had been blindfolded in Braun's car, recreates and retraces with great difficulty the way to a hideout where Timmy is being held. After fighting and subduing Wetzel and his accomplices, Gibson and the authorities can't find Braun or the boy and are about to give up when they spot Braun's cigar, still burning in an ashtray. They find him cowering in a closet with the boy, then drag him away to jail.

Cast
Mickey Rooney as Little Joe Braun
Steve Cochran as Bill Gibson
Mamie Van Doren as Mary Gibson
Ray Danton as Oscar 'The Executioner' Wetzel
Mel Tormé as Fred McAfee
Ray Anthony as Slim Clayburn
Jim Backus as Cliff Heldon
Jackie Coogan as Ed Brannell
Joey Forman as Ray Bailey
Charles Chaplin, Jr. as Bill Tragg
Vampira as Gina
Jay North as Timmy Gibson

Box office
The film earned $330,000 in the US and Canada and $350,000 elsewhere, resulting in a loss of $253,000.

See also
 List of American films of 1959

References

External links
 
 

1959 films
1959 crime drama films
CinemaScope films
American crime drama films
American black-and-white films
Films about the labor movement
Films directed by Charles F. Haas
Metro-Goldwyn-Mayer films
Remakes of American films
1950s English-language films
1950s American films